Jacques Roy is the name of:
 Jacques Roy (diplomat), Canadian diplomat and former ambassador
 Jacques Roy (mayor) (born 1970), American mayor of Alexandria, Louisiana